Lisitsyn is a rural locality (a khutor) in Malogorodkovsky Selsoviet Rural Settlement, Konyshyovsky District, Kursk Oblast, Russia. Population:

Geography 
The khutor is located on the Vablya River (a tributary of the Prutishche in the basin of the Seym), 72.5 km from the Russia–Ukraine border, 51 km north-west of Kursk, 12.5 km north-east of the district center – the urban-type settlement Konyshyovka, 6 km from the selsoviet center – Maloye Gorodkovo.

 Climate
Lisitsyn has a warm-summer humid continental climate (Dfb in the Köppen climate classification).

Transport 
Lisitsyn is located 68 km from the federal route  Ukraine Highway, 34 km from the route  Crimea Highway, 44.5 km from the route  (Trosna – M3 highway), 24 km from the road of regional importance  (Fatezh – Dmitriyev), 10.5 km from the road  (Konyshyovka – Zhigayevo – 38K-038), 25 km from the road  (Kursk – Lgov – Rylsk – border with Ukraine), 4.5 km from the road of intermunicipal significance  (38K-005 – Maloye Gorodkovo – Bolshoye Gorodkovo), 1.5 km from the road  (38N-136 – Ozerovka – Yuryevka – Pavlovka), 12 km from the nearest railway halt 552 km (railway line Navlya – Lgov-Kiyevsky).

The rural locality is situated 57 km from Kursk Vostochny Airport, 154 km from Belgorod International Airport and 258 km from Voronezh Peter the Great Airport.

References

Notes

Sources

Rural localities in Konyshyovsky District